The Big Bang is a 2019 Malayalam short film written and directed by Lal Bijo. The film is based on the consumption of water.

Plot 
The story is about Lalu, an employed youth, who doesn't know the value of water. One day he came to take some water and he heard some sounds near him, he is scared and runs away to the room.

References

 
 

Indian short films
2019 short films
2019 films
2010s Malayalam-language films
2010s Tamil-language films
2019 multilingual films
Indian multilingual films